The Mammoth Dictionary of Symbols is a reference work by Nadia Julien published by Robinson in 1996.

Contents
The Mammoth Dictionary of Symbols posits the two premises that symbols are outmoded, and that a symbol is a material object.

Reception
Tim Smith reviewed The Mammoth Dictionary of Symbols for Arcane magazine, rating it a 3 out of 10 overall. Smith comments that "Definitions such as: 'There is a tradition that says that swallows receive the souls of dead kings', or: 'Footwear is an indispensable item of dress in temperate regions', further undermine this as a reference work. That said, it could make a decent enough bog-read if only so you can fill in the gaps yourself."

References

1996 non-fiction books
Reference works